The Trams in Mandalay were owned and operated by the Mandalay Electric Company, which was incorporated in London in October 1902 with a capital of £ 200,000.

History 

The construction began in December 1902 by Dick, Kerr & Co., and the first car was moved electrically on 17 June 1904. From the center at Zegyo bazar the tramway radiated in the following three branches:

 To the shore, where the steamers embarked their passengers
 To the Arakan Pagoda
 To the Court House

The rails were double spiked onto hardwood sleepers, which had been laid on a ballast bed.

The rolling stock consisted of 24 electric motor cars. These were of the single deck, open, cross bench type, built by the Electric Railway & Tramway Carriage Works in Preston, Lancashire. The roof frames were composed entirely of teak, covered by cotton laid in a wet coat of white paint. They had electric headlights with 100 V.

The track and overhead cables were severely damaged during the air raid of 3 April 1942 and subsequently were dismantled.

References 

Tram transport in Myanmar
3 ft 6 in gauge railways in Myanmar
Mandalay
Defunct town tramway systems by city